Doumer Hill is a snow-covered pyramidal hill,  high, forming the summit of Doumer Island in the Palmer Archipelago. It was first charted by the French Antarctic Expedition, 1903–05, under Jean-Baptiste Charcot, and was named in 1958 by the UK Antarctic Place-Names Committee, in association with Doumer Island.

References 

Hills of Graham Land
Landforms of the Palmer Archipelago
Doumer Island